Marmorofusus wellsi is a species of sea snail, a marine gastropod mollusk in the family Fasciolariidae, the spindle snails, the tulip snails and their allies.

Distribution
This marine species is endemic to Australia and occurs off Western Australia, from NW of Bluff Point near Geraldton to Cape Naturaliste and to Albany; 20–221 m; Margaret River to Esperance, 30–100 m

References

External links
 Snyder M.A. 2004. Two new Fusinus (Mollusca : Gastropoda : Fasciolariidae) from Western Australia. Molluscan Research 24(2): 123-130
 Lyons W.G. & Snyder M.A. (2019). Reassignments to the genus Marmorofusus Snyder & Lyons, 2014 (Neogastropoda: Fasciolariidae: Fusininae) of species from the Red Sea, Indian Ocean, and southwestern Australia. Zootaxa. 4714(1): 1-64

wellsi
Gastropods described in 2004
Gastropods of Australia